Martha Lewis is a Chesapeake Bay skipjack built in 1955. Her home port is Havre de Grace, Harford County, Maryland.

She was listed on the National Register of Historic Places in 2008. She is assigned Maryland dredge number 8.

References

External links

, including photo dated 2009, at Maryland Historical Trust

1955 ships
Harford County, Maryland
Havre de Grace, Maryland
Ships built in Maryland
Ships on the National Register of Historic Places in Maryland
National Register of Historic Places in Harford County, Maryland